The 1999 Nigerian Senate election in Kebbi State was held on February 20, 1999, to elect members of the Nigerian Senate to represent Kebbi State. Adamu Augie representing Kebbi North and Yahaya Abubakar Abdullahi representing Kebbi North won on the platform of All Nigeria Peoples Party, while Danladi Bamaiyi representing Kebbi South won on the platform of the Peoples Democratic Party.

Overview

Summary

Results

Kebbi North 
The election was won by Adamu Augie of the All Nigeria Peoples Party.

Kebbi North 
The election was won by Yahaya Abubakar Abdullahi of the All Nigeria Peoples Party.

Kebbi South 
The election was won by Danladi Bamaiyi of the Peoples Democratic Party.

References 

Keb
Keb
Kebbi State Senate elections